Antonio Sementa is an Italian bridge player.

Bridge accomplishments

Wins 

 Bermuda Bowl (1) 2013 
 Rosenblum Cup (1) 1998 
 World Olympiad Teams Championship (1) 2008
 North American Bridge Championships (6)
 Mitchell Board-a-Match Teams (1) 2011 
 Roth Open Swiss Teams (1) 2006 
 Reisinger (3) 2010, 2011, 2019 
 Vanderbilt (1) 2007

Runners-up 

 Bermuda Bowl (1) 2009 
 Buffett Cup (1) 2010
 North American Bridge Championships (4)
 Jacoby Open Swiss Teams (2) 2001, 2009 
 Vanderbilt (1) 2023 
 Roth Open Swiss Teams (1) 2009

Notes

External links
 
 

Italian contract bridge players
Bermuda Bowl players
Living people
Year of birth missing (living people)